Portugal Fashion is the biggest Portuguese fashion industry event created in 1995. 
It's held mostly in Porto, which is the Portuguese fashion capital, but also in Lisbon. The event has at least two seasons, spring-summer and fall-winter, every year.

References

External links 

1995 establishments in Portugal
Fashion events in Portugal
Recurring events established in 1995
Golden Globes (Portugal) winners